Skorpion may refer to:

 Škorpion vz. 61 a submachine gun
 Skorpion (AFV), see List of modern armoured fighting vehicles
 "Skorpion" (song), a 2010 song by Estonian group Urban Symphony
 PZL-230 Skorpion, a cancelled Polish attack jet

See also
 Scorpion (disambiguation)